Maīdān ٰٰٰValley is a valley in Afghanistan located in Wardak Province, in the north-eastern part of the country.

See also 
 Valleys of Afghanistan
 Wardak Province

Notes 

Valleys of Afghanistan
Maidan Wardak Province